Mailyne Andrieux (born 1 December 1987) is a former French retired professional tennis player.

Career
During her career she won an ITF singles and two ITF doubles titles. In the Grand Slam tournaments she achieved her best results reaching the first round in singles and doubles at the French Open in 2005.

ITF Circuit finals

Singles (1–0)

Doubles (2–1)

References

1987 births
Living people
French female tennis players